Mandalika International Street Circuit (known as Pertamina Mandalika International Street Circuit for commercial purposes) is located in the Mandalika resort area on Lombok island, part of the West Nusa Tenggara province of Indonesia. The circuit opened by hosting rounds of the Asia Talent Cup and Superbike World Championship in late 2021, followed by Grand Prix motorcycle races in 2022.

The sports cluster and entertainment project, measuring 120 hectares, is expected to include the construction of hotels and other facilities. As a purposely-constructed racing track with wide run-off areas, it is claimed to be a street circuit as parts may be used in future, allowing normal traffic access to new resort facilities. Dorna chief Carmelo Ezpeleta confirmed in 2019: "We've always said that we don't race in a street circuit...".

Development area
As part of the conservation maintenance, the vegetation that provides the backdrop to the Mandalika Resort area will be set aside as a conservation area of over 3,000 hectares. This area with many native species will only be accessible for low-impact activities, such as cycling or hiking to minimize damage to the flora and fauna.

History

On 12 November 2021, the President of Indonesia, Joko Widodo, inaugurated the Mandalika International Circuit. He then did a lap around the race track. Previously, Indonesia had held World Championship racing in 1996 and 1997 as well as the Superbike from 1994 to 1997, all at the Sentul International Circuit in Bogor, West Java near the nation's capital of Jakarta. However, due to the financial crisis, Indonesia was forced to suspend its motorsport hosting program. This circuit was built to increase the number of tourists who come to the Mandalika resort area and introduce new tourist destinations.

The circuit was FIM inspected in 2022 obtaining 'A' grade, allowing for MotoGP series events to be run. Previously, it was graded as 'B' at the time of the World Superbike event in November 2021.

In March 2022, the designer of the circuit tweeted that he first configured the track layout at a beachside hotel on a visit to Lombok five years earlier.

Progress

On 23 February 2019, it was announced that the circuit would host the returning Indonesian motorcycle Grand Prix in 2022. The track has  length with 17 corners.

In April 2021, it was announced that the race circuit layout and surface was completed, but without the associated infrastructure. Officials from Grand Prix motorcycle racing organisers (Dorna) inspected the track, and no races could be scheduled for MotoGP, Moto2 and Moto3 in 2021; World Superbike and Asia Talent Cup events were held in November 2021.

The circuit was inspected by race organisers, the FIM and Dorna, resulting in large scale resurfacing being required, stretching from "before Turn 17 until after Turn 5", to be completed seven days before the scheduled first motorcycle grands prix on 20 March 2022.

During practice for the motorcycle grand prix race weekend in March 2022, new holes began to appear in the resurfaced part of the track, causing both the Moto2 and MotoGP races to be were shortened. Additionally, the MotoGP race was delayed by heavy rain, until the rain abated coinciding with the presence of a shaman flown in for the purpose of repelling the rain. Riders were hit by flying stones, and many stated the surface would need to be resurfaced before the next year's event.

Controversies 
The project was heavily criticised by the United Nations, due to reports of local Sasak people being dispossessed of their homes, lands and livelihoods.

The Indonesian Government, through its Permanent Mission of the Republic of Indonesia to the United Nations, World Trade Organization and Other International Organizations Geneva, Switzerland, rejected the allegations as false and hyperbolic narrative. The Permanent Mission also issued the report chronicling the Mandalika construction, and explanations and clarifications surrounding it.

The Asia Talent Cup (ATC) races intended for 12–14 November 2021 as a shakedown run were postponed due to organisational "challenges" that needed to be overcome before the following weekend races of 20–21, when it was intended to run the ATC together with the last 2021 World Superbike event. The difficulties were reported as a shortage of track marshals resulting in unacceptably low competitor safety levels.

During the MotoGP series pre-season machine testing in early 2022, Indonesian press reported that local landowners had not been paid for their land taken by the Indonesian government to create the circuit, due to 'Konsinyasi', meaning that disputes over purchase prices could leave them without the land and without the money they are owed.

Layout 
 
Repsol Honda racer, Marc Márquez, said that the Mandalika Circuit has a simple layout. However, he believes the race there will be very entertaining.

"This is a simple circuit in terms of layout, but the conditions make it interesting. There is only one line to overtake. Despite the difficult track conditions, the layout was met with praise from riders, with Honda's Pol Espargaró noting that "it has its own character" the track is nice. It has a little bit of everything," said Espargaró.

Events
 Current
 March: Superbike World Championship, Idemitsu bLU CRu Yamaha Sunday Race, Mandalika Racing Series
 July: Mandalika Racing Series
 August: Asia Road Racing Championship
 October: Grand Prix motorcycle racing Indonesian motorcycle Grand Prix, Asia Talent Cup, Mandalika Racing Series

Lap records

The official fastest race lap records at the Mandalika International Circuit are listed as:

Events winners

Feeder event

Asia Talent Cup

IMI Mandalika Racing Series

Grand Prix motorcycle racing

Superbike

World SBK

World SSP

See also
 List of motor racing tracks
 List of motor racing tracks in Asia

Notes

References

Mandalika
Mandalika
Mandalika
Mandalika
Mandalika
Mandalika
Mandalika